Dinesh Sharma is a Nepalese film actor, producer, director and television personality. He started his career with movie “Chatyang” in 1992. Since then he acted in both negative and positive roles. He is regarded as one of the greatest villains in Nepali Film Industry. He officially retired from Film Industry before leaving Nepal to settle in United States in late 2017. He currently lives in Boston, Massachusetts.

Biography
Dinesh Sharma started his acting debut with a supporting role in 1992 in the Nepali film Chatyang, the 80th Nepali film. It is produced by Bishwa Murti and directed by Pratap Subba. The actors in Chatyang are Rajesh Hamal, Gauri Malla, Dinesh Sharma, Rupa Rana, Tika Pahadi, Subhadra Adhikari, and Ramesh Budhathoki. Sharma directed the film Danav under his own banner, Rakshanda Films, and produced the Nepali film Antya. He has worked on more than 200 Nepali feature films as an actor in more than 25 years.

He has also had roles in TV serials including: Achanak, Parichaya Yatana, Gahana, Santan, Dui Thopa Aansu, and Bhumika. For social awareness, Dinesh Sharma has appeared in more than a dozen documentaries for awareness of HIV/AIDS and has taken part in an educational awareness program for Nepal's rural areas. His commercially successful feature films in a leading role are Chatyang (1992), Tuhuro (1993), Bandhan(1996)  Gunynu cholo(1995), Jalan (1997) Daag (1999), Surakshaa (1999), Pocketmaar (1998),  Mato Bolcha (1999), Dharmaputra (1999), Army (2000), Mann (2001), Sahar (2001),  Sangam(2002),  Ko Afno ko Birano(2005), Pratighat (2006), Jungali Manche (2006) and Antya (2007) etc.

Selective filmography

Upcoming projects
Dinesh Sharma's latest production is the feature film Dil Bichara.

See also
 List of Nepalese actors

References

External links
 Dinesh Sharma Official Website
 

Nepalese male film actors
Living people
21st-century Nepalese male actors
1970 births
People from Rupandehi District